Roark is an unincorporated community located in Leslie County, Kentucky, United States. Main schools, Redbird Christian, Leslie, Stinnet Elementary, and Mountain View elementary. It is the birthplace of the Osborne Brothers.

References

Unincorporated communities in Leslie County, Kentucky
Unincorporated communities in Kentucky